The Scottsburg Courthouse Square Historic District is a national historic district located at Scottsburg, Scott County, Indiana.  The district encompasses 48 contributing buildings and 8 contributing objects in the central business district of Scottsburg centered on the Scott County Courthouse. It developed between about 1873 and 1952, and includes notable examples of Italianate, Romanesque Revival, Gothic Revival, and Stick Style / Eastlake movement style architecture. The courthouse was built in 1873-1874 after the decision was made to finally locate the county seat of Scott County into a central location within the county, which caused the founding of Scottsburg.  Located in the district is the separately listed Scottsburg Depot.  Other notable contributing resources include the Town Tavern (1924), A&P Grocery (1923), Corner Drugstore (c. 1880), Harmon Building (1907), City Hall (1899-1900), Napper's Hospital (1936), Scott Theatre (1946), Scott County Public (Carnegie) Library (1919), Scott County Bank (1906), Prosser's Hardware (1912), and a statue of William Hayden English (1908).

It was listed on the National Register of Historic Places in 2003.

References

Historic districts on the National Register of Historic Places in Indiana
Courthouses on the National Register of Historic Places in Indiana
Italianate architecture in Indiana
Romanesque Revival architecture in Indiana
Gothic Revival architecture in Indiana
Buildings and structures in Scott County, Indiana
National Register of Historic Places in Scott County, Indiana